The University Philosophical Society (UPS), commonly known as The Phil, is a student paper-reading and debating society in Trinity College, Dublin, Ireland. Founded in 1683 it is the  oldest student, collegial and paper-reading society in the world.

The society is based within the Graduates Memorial Building of Trinity College. Throughout its long history it has welcomed many prominent guests and some of its most notable members include Ernest Walton, John Butler Yeats, Samuel Beckett, Bram Stoker and Oscar Wilde.

Society

The Phil's members meet every Thursday during term to discuss a paper, debate a motion or hear an address. Traditionally a paper-reading society, meetings sometimes continue the format of responses to a paper rather than debate on a motion.

Its rooms are within the Graduates' Memorial Building (GMB) of Trinity College, which it has shared with the College Historical Society (the Hist) since the building's construction in 1902, where it provides facilities for its members such as a games and a conversation room. The Phil shares the use of its Bram Stoker Room with the College Theological Society (the Theo). It holds most of its meetings in the GMB's Debating Chamber with meetings having an expected audience of above two hundred being held in the larger lecture theatres of the college.

The society also hosts numerous social events, internal competitions, sporting events, blood drives and the occasional concert. It endeavours each year in providing debating workshops, developmental competitions for members and school children. Furthermore, it has a strong history in intervarsity debating competitions, at both an international and national level.

The society publishes The Philander as an annual Freshers' guide to the society.

Membership
Membership of the society is open to all Undergraduate and Postgraduate students, as well as all staff members of Trinity College. It offers four year membership to students of the university.

History

The history of the University Philosophical Society spans over three centuries, several guises, identities and name changes.

Foundation in the 17th century
In 1683, natural philosopher and political writer William Molyneux (b. 1656) founded the Dublin Philosophical Society, with the assistance of his brother Sir Thomas Molyneux and future Provost St George Ashe. They intended it to be the equivalent of the Royal Society in London (with which it maintained cultural ties) as well as the Philosophical Society at the University of Oxford. The society was traditionally a paper reading society; however it also included many demonstrations of the latest science and mathematical endeavour of that era. The first meeting on 15 October 1683 was in the Provost's lodgings at Trinity College Dublin, a location where members continued to meet.

Sometime after December 1683, Provost Robert Huntington became the society's first Senior Patron, promising protection and assistance, a role the Provost of Trinity College still holds. While at the time no particular precedent existed for Trinity College to recognise it, it can be considered  the college's first such society.

On 1 November 1684 William Petty was elected as the first President of the society, and William Molyneux elected as its first Secretary. The current numbering takes this as the first session of the University Philosophical Society.

Reformation in the 19th century

In November 1842, to mark the original session date the Dublin Philosophical Society was fully reformed under its original name, traditionally meeting on Mondays, to cater for those Trinity College students too young to join other societies in Dublin. The first meeting took place in Marlborough Street.

At the time, undergraduates were not allowed to join most College societies, such as the College Historical Society. It then became the Dublin University Philosophical Society in February 1843  when it was recognized by the college, with then Provost Franc Sadleir reassuming the traditional role of Senior Patron.

During this time the society had its rooms in No. 4 (now House 4) in Parliament Square  with larger meetings taking place within the Examination Hall.

In 1860, the Dublin University Philosophical Society changed its name to the University Philosophical Society. This makes the Phil the oldest, student, paper-reading, and collegial society in the world, as well as currently being the largest such society in Ireland.

Among the notable events held was the demonstration of an early telephone by Stephen Yeates in 1865.

20th century

The society suffered greatly, with the rest of Trinity College during the First World War. Ireland was still part of the British Empire during the outbreak of the war and so many Irish enlisted. However, there was a diverse mixture between members who predominantly described as being part of the Protestant Ascendancy and those who believed more in Irish republicanism.

The meetings and overall strength of the society was massively diminished during the period, with there being no Inaugural Meeting from 1913 until 1919 after the end of the war.

From 1913 (229th Session) to 1916 (231st Session) ten officers of the society resigned their positions to enlist. Minutes from the time mention that many more members of the society would go on to enlist, however their names went unrecorded.

In 1919 the names of eight past officers and members of council of the society who had been killed during the war was read aloud at the Opening Meeting.

 James Austin, President 1913-1914 (229th Session).
 AEL West, President 1915-1916 (231st Session).
 Reverend Everard Digges La Touche, Seceratary 1907-1908 (223rd Session).
 JHF Leland, Treasurer 1909-1910 (225th Session).
 Walter Osborne Varian, Treasurer 1915-1916 (231st Session).
 JS West, Registrar 1914-1915 (230th Session).
 Francis George McGibney, Member of Council 1912-1913 (228th Session).
 William Kee, Member of Council 1914-1915 (230th Session).

The Irish War of Independence began shortly after the beginning of 1919, public and political will to remember those lost during the war was weak. This meant that the names of many more members of the society who were also killed during the First World War went unrecorded by the society.

The Second World War, had a lesser effect on the society, though one notable President of the early 1940s was lawyer, Nigerian independence activist and Supreme Court Chief Justice Udo Udoma.

Dublin University Elizabethan Society ("The Eliz")

The first female students were admitted to the college in 1904, however they were unable to join any of the student societies that existed at the time. In response to this the Dublin University Elizabethan Society (more commonly known as The Liz and later, The Eliz) was founded in 1905 by the first woman student of the university Isabel Marion Weir Johnston.  The society was a female-only debating society, having sent teams to the Irish Times National Debating Championship from relatively early in the competitions history. It also hosted many debates, paper discussions, group discussions and the Eliz Garden Party (within Fellow's Square) which was considered one of the social highlights of Trinity term in the college. Each year the society welcomed esteemed guests to speak on topics regarding the history, the societal limitations of women and feminism. These included such guests as Ninette de Valois, dancer and founder of The Royal Ballet, who visited in late 1964 to celebrate the society's 60th year.

The society had its rooms in No.6 (now House 6) in Parliament Square, housing many amenities for female students within the college, including one of only a handful of female toilets on the campus.

As mentioned in the following section, over the years there had been great debate within both the University Philosophical Society and the Dublin University Elizabethan Society regarding a merger of both societies into one. There was strong individual opposition within both societies however, with a vote in 1968 by the Eliz rejecting a merger. However, in 1981 the Dublin University Elizabethan Society merged with the University Philosophical Society, which vastly increased female membership and increased debating within the society.

Today as a symbolic gesture, the highest ranking female officer of the Phil is accorded the honorary title of President of the Elizabethan Society.

Inclusion of women
It was the 1953/54 session of the Phil that first welcomed in long overdue gender equality advances: Women were at last allowed to attend public business meetings and then also to speak at them (provided though Standing Orders were suspended!). What is more, at the end of that session, membership was actually even opened up to them. Sadly though, this final breakthrough proved short-lived as the College Board after a gap of only one term – and although it had no direct constitutional jurisdiction here – in early 1955 voted down female membership for that year pending possible reorganisation of the Major Societies. It was an understandable decision perhaps from the Board's point of view except that even more sadly such restructuring was never led by them as announced or indeed subsequently. While reorganisations and possible mergers between the Phil and the Hist and the Phil and the Eliz and the Phil and the SRC (Student Representative Council) + the Eliz surfaced variously at periodic intervals actual plans ‘with legs’ never seemed to result. Divisions and maybe feelings of self-interest within and between the different factions, the continuing unwillingness/inability of the college for some reason to meaningfully grapple with this process and, what is more, effectively address the issue of student union type facilities that were commonplace in other institutions of higher education all seemingly presented insurmountable hurdles.

Indeed, it wasn't until session 1963/64 that a further vote taken by the Phil on the admission of women, although it was lost by only 3 votes. Some advances were though made: From that session onwards, it was agreed that women could at last reply to papers read to the Society and, in 1965, Joanna Walmsley became the first woman to read her paper to the society. (It was entitled "Tolstoy - Realist or Moralist?"). One of concerns held over the years had been that the Society's facilities were generally inadequate for a larger mixed membership. In session 1967/1968. opposition even led then President of the Phil (Gordon Ledbetter) to resign in exasperation. It was a matter though that wasn't going to go away. At the first Council meeting and a subsequent private business in the following session (1967–68), this aspect again prominently featured as a concern. There were also many in the Phil who felt the way forward would be achieved through revisiting the idea of a merger with the Eliz to form a super sized Major Society.  However, even setting to one side the thorny issue of finding satisfactory accommodation for such a body, it also turned out to be the case this time - as it had previously that the Eliz just weren't sufficiently interested such a proposal. (That was of course to change some years later).

With such topics under the spotlight, a feeling though also started to emerge from the active membership that discussion was going around in circles once again. The halfway house with regards to female participation was just unsatisfactory.  For quite sincerely held reasons of equal rights and inclusivity and indeed on a practical level to revitalise our business and expand membership the Society had to try and go it alone regardless.  So a motion calling for women to quite simply be admitted as full members was proposed, debated at Private Business on 30th. November 1967...and was elatedly passed!  The then President of the Phil (Geoff Goolnik) pointed out to those gathered that restrictions on female membership had in fact been a matter of convention as gender was never once mentioned in the then current Laws – unlike with those of the two other Major Societies, viz.the Eliz and the Hist (College Historical Society).

At the following private business meeting held on 5th. December three women were proposed and voted in as members – including the then President of the Eliz (Elizabeth Hall) who was appropriately nominated by Goolnik and seconded by ‘Gully’ Stanford, the then Auditor of the Hist, in his capacity as an ordinary member of the Phil!  Finally, the first female member to address the Society after it had become gender free, Gráinne Monks, was also elected on 1st. February 1968 as the first female member of Council.

In Trinity News’ edition of 25 November 1953,  an anonymous female contributor had declared that "The bar to the admission of women to [the other] major societies ...is a real deprivation to everyone – to College women, to the members of the societies, themselves and, most important, to the University". Fifteen years and five days later the Phil at least eventually, permanently and proudly righted that wrong.

21st century
Today the University Philosophical Society is one of the largest student society within the college and Ireland. Its meetings include weekly paper readings and debates. Additionally it invites many internationally esteemed guests each year, regularly interviews with public figures, which have included Al Pacino, Desmond Tutu, Angela Merkel and Stephen Fry.

Governance
The Phil is governed by a Council elected by the members of the society each year. There are eight officers: President, Secretary, Treasurer, Registrar, Debates Convenor, Librarian, Steward, and Schools Convenor. All officers are directly elected. In addition to the officers are a fourteen Members of Council. The Members of Council serve as deputies to the officers, aid in the execution of their responsibilities and any other such work necessary for the efficient running of the society. Six are directly elected each year. One of these six is then selected by the council to serve as Vice President of the society. The Senior Member of Council is also elected in the same manner as the officers of the society and is delegated the responsibility of co-ordinating the other Members of Council. The newly elected Council may then add up to seven further Members of Council via co-option.

Bram Stoker Club

In addition to its usual events, the society added a sub-group, the Bram Stoker Club (more commonly known as Bram), to its organization in 2011. Named after one of the Phil's most illustrious presidents (Bram Stoker), the club holds weekly afternoon paper-readings on a range of topics. These paper-readings have served to carry on the long tradition of the society, which had fallen slightly out of fashion in recent years.

In January 2013, the club was incorporated into the official laws of the University Philosophical Society by majority vote. This was then officially recognised by the Dublin University Central Societies Committee in March of the same year.

It had its first foray outside of college in 2013, entering the winning team of John Engle and Liam Brophy in that years Irish Times National Debating Championship.

During the 4th Session, the club welcomed three living descendants of its namesake Bram Stoker. Noel Dobbs, Robin MacCaw and Dacre Stoker met with members of the club and society at large. Each presented papers on the history of Bram Stoker and legacy of Dracula within their family. Also in attendance was distant relative and Senator David Norris. Finally the Stoker family presented the club with portrait of Bram Stoker by Dublin artist Damian Byrne, and a plaque specifying the connection between the society and their ancestor.

Competitive debating

External debating competitions
The society has a presence on the competitive debating circuit. Having first won the Irish Times National Debating Championship in 1961 the society has gone on to win and place in several other well known debating competitions. These include the John Smith Memorial Mace, World Universities Debating Championship, Irish National Law Debates, Cork IV and the UCD Vice Presidents' Cup IV.. In 2022, Dylan McCarthy and Jack Palmer from the Phil won the European Universities Debating Championships in Zagreb, becoming the second Irish team to win the championships and the first from Trinity.

Internal debating competitions
The society runs several internal debating competitions each year.
These consist of:
The Eamon O'Coine Memorial Maiden Speaker's Competition (or "Maidens"); for first-time speakers in college.
The Jeremy Clarkson Memorial Debating Competition (or "Clarkies"), consisting of a series of regular weekly debates.; satirically named after TV presenter Jeremy Clarkson. Formerly known as The Maggies, after former Prime Minister of the United Kingdom Margaret Thatcher 
The Elizabethan Society Memorial Pro-Am Competition (or "Lizzies"); a competition whereby experienced debaters (Pros) are teamed with less experienced speakers (Ams). 
 The Isabel Marion Weir Johnston Memorial (or "Izzy's"); is an internal competition for all members of the society. It is named in honour of the first woman to enter Trinity where she went on to found the Elizabethan Society which later merged with the Philosophical Society.
The J.P Mahaffy Memorial (or "Mahaffy's"); named after former President of the society John Pentland Mahaffy internal debating competition for Junior Freshman ("fresher") teams of two.

Trinity intervarsity
Each year, normally in January, the society jointly with the Hist hosts the Claire Stewart Trinity IV. Before 2015 this consisted of the Trinity Invitational and the Dean Swift Intervarsity. In 2015, the Trinity Invitational was replaced with Trinity Women's Debating Competition.

Phil Speaks

The 'Phil Speaks Debating and Public Speaking Initiative', commonly known as 'Phil Speaks', is a campaign aimed at promoting, as well as developing skills in public speaking and oratory. Formed by the society in 2004 the initiative combines in-school oratory workshops, with Pro–Am (Professional-Amateur) learning competitions to encourage these skills in students of all secondary schools throughout Ireland.

At the end of the contest, the society hosts the Phil Speaks Competitive Weekend modelled on the format of a University Intervarsity Competition held within the Graduates Memorial Building, with the grand final taking place in the Debating Chamber.

Awards
Annually, the society internally awards the author of the best paper and the best chamber speaker from its membership, medals of oratory and composition. The society also awards the Gold Medal of Honorary Patronage and the Bram Stoker Medal to various guests each year.

Among the awards received by the society are awards from the internal Central Societies Committee of Trinity College, including the "best event" award for 'This House Believes that Society is Failing People with Disabilities' in 2019 and "best large society" in 2015.

The society has also received recognition from the Board of Irish College Societies (BICS). This national organisation, constituted in 1995, is dedicated to providing a national forum for the societies in Ireland's Universities, Colleges and Institutes of Education. The University Philosophical Society received a "Best individual (Large Society)" award from the BICS in 2013, presented to 328th Session President Lorcan Clarke.

Honorary patrons

Through its years in college, the Society has recorded the presence of many notable guests, the most distinguished of whom are named honorary patrons of the society. Included amongst these are multiple Nobel Prize laureates, both before and after their receipt of the Prize, such as W. B. Yeats, Heads of State and of Government, notable actors and musicians, as well as well-known intellectuals. Guests have also included all Taoisigh since Charles Haughey.

Controversies
A number of guests, invited by the Phil over the years, have courted controversy. Contributors to its debates included Oswald Mosley during his residence in Ireland. In 1988, the Society invited then–Holocaust denier David Irving to speak. A large protest by students, staff, Jewish groups, socialists, and anti-Nazi activists resulted in the meeting being relocated to a hotel conference room and held in the small hours of the morning. The traditional vote of thanks to Irving for his paper was defeated, which is rare in the society's history.

The address of Austrian politician Jörg Haider to the society in late 2002 led to a protest by self-described anti-fascist activists, which continued through the debate, with noise being made outside the chamber and interjections in the society's proceedings within. An invitation to British National Party (BNP) official Tony Wentworth was revoked after threats of physical action by leftist groups.

Another guest to generate controversy was Islamist Anjem Choudary, who hailed the 9/11 terrorists as martyrs. Former Taoiseach John Bruton threatened to withdraw from a Phil debate later that year over this invitation, which was not withdrawn. Bruton later became an Honorary Patron of the Society, and Anjem Choudary has been invited to speak at the Phil's lectern several times.

In 2011, the Phil encountered controversy when it invited BNP leader Nick Griffin to speak at a Thursday night debate on immigration. After raging protests, talks with college officials and physical threats made to the members and council the invitation was reluctantly withdrawn by the President of the 327th session, Eoin O'Liathain. In a press statement the Phil said that "it is unfortunate that circumstances have arisen under which the planned debate can no longer go ahead without compromising the safety of staff and students". Despite these challenges the session would go on to be voted Best Society in Trinity College that year.

In 2015, members of the Phil were asked by the President to collect copies of The University Times after the newspaper printed details of confidential correspondence that had been supplied to the newspaper in the understanding that it would not be referred to in an article. While The University Times subsequently agreed to withdraw the edition of the paper in question from circulation, after their breach of journalistic standards, Trinity News falsely reported that members of council had discussed calling a motion to impeach the president as a result of the society's actions in collecting the newspapers. A motion of confidence in the president was later passed at a general meeting of the society. The incident was cited as one of the factors leading to Samuel Riggs, then the editor of The University Times, agreeing to take a permanent leave of absence from his position as well as the resignation of two senior Trinity News editors.

Notable members

Academia
 Robert Stawell Ball, ex-Sch., Royal Astronomer of Ireland and Lowndean Professor of Astronomy and Geometry at the University of Cambridge. President, 1860–61.
 Valentine Ball, geologist. Treasurer, 1863–64.
 J.B. Bury, ex-Sch., historian, classicist, Byzantinist and philologist.
 George Coffey, scholar of Irish history and cultural revivalist. President, 1880–81.
 William Macneile Dixon, British academic and author, Regius Professor of English Language and Literature, Glasgow. President, 1889–90, Librarian, 1888–89.
 Mervyn A. Ellison, ex-Sch., astronomer and authority on solar flares. President, 1931–32, Treasurer, 1930–31.
 William Hugh Ferrar, classical scholar. Treasurer, 1855–56.
 John Pentland Mahaffy, ex-Sch., classicist and polymath scholar. President, 1858–59.
 Vincent Arthur Smith, Indologist, historian and member of the Imperial Civil Service. President, 1868–69.
 W. J. M. Starkie, Greek scholar.
 William Stokes, doctor and professor of surgery.
 John Lighton Synge, mathematician and physicist. Treasurer, 1917–18.
 Ernest Walton, ex-Sch., physicist and Nobel Laureate. Member of Council, 1925–26.
 Trevor West, Sch., mathematician and Senator. Treasurer, 1959–60, Registrar, 1958–59.
 William Wilde, Irish otolaryngologist and ophthalmologist and polymath, father of Oscar Wilde, member
 Bertram Windle, British anatomist, archaeologist, scientist and writer. Librarian, 1877–78.

Arts
 Norman Rodway, ex-Sch., actor. 
 John Butler Yeats, artist and father of William Butler Yeats.

Broadcasting and Journalism
 Daire Brehan, Irish broadcaster, barrister and actress. Secretary, 1976–77.
 Sarah Carey, columnist and broadcaster. Registrar, 1991–92.
 Marc Coleman, economics editor of Newstalk and columnist for the Sunday Independent. Secretary, 1992–93.
 Ken Early, journalist and sports broadcaster. Steward, 1998–99.
 Alex Massie, prominent Scottish journalist. Steward, 1996–97.

Law
 James Campbell, 1st Baron Glenavy, Lord Chancellor of Ireland, Attorney-General for Ireland, Solicitor-General for Ireland, Member of Parliament and later first Chairman of the Free State Senate.
 Richard Cherry, Attorney-General for Ireland and Liberal MP. Secretary, 1879–80.
 Gerald Fitzgibbon, ex-Sch., Solicitor-General for Ireland, 1877–78 and Lord Justice of Appeal. Secretary, 1857–58.
 Jonathan Pim (1858-1949), Solicitor-General for Ireland, Attorney-General for Ireland and Lord Justice of Ireland in the aftermath of the Easter Rising. President, 1883–84, Secretary, 1882–83, Librarian, 1881–82.
 Udo Udoma, former Justice of the Nigerian Supreme Court, former Chief Justice of Uganda. President, 1942–43, Secretary, 1941–42, Librarian, 1940–41.

Literature
 Edmund John Armstrong, poet. President, 1864–65.
 Samuel Beckett, ex-Sch., dramatist and poet, Nobel Laureate.
 Kate Cruise O'Brien, author. 
 Edward Dowden, poet and critic. President, 1862–63, Secretary, 1861–62.
 Standish James O'Grady, author, journalist and historian. Secretary, 1866–67.
 Bram Stoker, novelist and short story writer. President, 1868–69, Secretary, 1867–68.
 Oscar Wilde, author, playwright and poet.
 Gabriel Fielding, author and poet. Nom de plume of Dr Alan Barnsley 1935–1939. Winner Silver Medal in Oratory 1939.

Nobility
 Charles Austin Thomas Robert John Joseph ffrench, 6th Baron ffrench, 1868–1955. Deputy Lieutenant of County Galway.
 Charles Edward MacDermot, The Mac Dermot, Prince of Coolavin, 1904–47. Registrar, 1883–84. His son and successor, Charles John MacDermot (Prince of Coolavin, 1947–79), was also a member.
 Martin Morris, 2nd Baron Killanin, Conservative peer. Secretary, 1888–89.

Politics and government
 Gerald Brunskill, Unionist MP. Treasurer, 1887–88, Registrar, 1886–87.
 Nessa Childers MEP, Member of European Parliament. Registrar, 1977–78, SMC 1976–77.
 Paschal Donohoe TD, Minister for Public Expenditure, National Development Plan Delivery and Reform. Secretary, 1993–94.
 Cecil Harmsworth, 1st Baron Harmsworth, Liberal MP, businessman and brother of press barons Lord Northcliffe and Lord Rothermere. Registrar, 1889–90.
 Caesar Litton Falkiner, Unionist MP. President, 1885–86, Treasurer, 1884–85, Librarian, 1883–84.
 George Noble Plunkett, anti-treaty republican, member of the First Dáil and Ireland's first Minister for Foreign Affairs, 1919–21.
 James Wallace Quinton, chief commissioner of Assam from 1889 until his murder by rebels in Manipur in 1891. President, 1855–56, Secretary, 1854–55.
 Robert Rowlette, TD, Senator and doctor. Secretary, 1895–96.

Religion
 Hugh Dunlop Brown, President of the Irish Baptist Association, theologian and prominent unionist.
 John Baptist Crozier, Anglican bishop. President, 1874–75, Secretary, 1873–4, Treasurer, 1872–73.
 Ralph Creed Meredith, chaplain to King George VI and Queen Elizabeth II. President, 1910–11, Secretary, 1909–10.
 Charles D'Arcy, ex-Sch., Anglican bishop. Treasurer, 1883–84.
 James Walsh, Dean of Christ Church Cathedral, Dublin, 1908–18.

References

External links
 TCDPhil.com 
 Assorted records of the Society

1683 establishments in the British Empire
Organizations established in 1683
Philosophical societies
Philosophical Society, University
Trinity College Dublin